Monacoa griseus, also known as the Grey mirrorbelly, is a species of fish in the family Opisthoproctidae.
It is found in the Southwest Pacific Ocean.

References

Opisthoproctidae
Fish of the Pacific Ocean
Taxa named by Jan Yde Poulsen
Taxa named by Ingvar Byrkjedal
Fish described in 2016